Tushaspa was a "Yavanaraja" (Greek King or Governor) for Emperor Ashoka, in the area of Girnar, near Junagadh, in Gujarat, India. He is only known from the Junagadh rock inscription of Rudradaman, in which the Western Satrap king Rudradaman, writing circa 150 CE, mentions his role in the construction of a local dam, in which he added a canal during the reign of Ashoka. The part of the inscription mentioning him reads:

According to some authors, the name Tushaspa seems to be Persian rather than Greek. Other authors however, consider that he was Greco-Bactrian, given his qualification as a "Yavana", the usual name for Greeks in the east.

Ashoka is known to have mentioned the presence of "Yavanas" in his kingdom in several of his Edicts of Ashoka:

References

Indo-Greeks
3rd-century BC Greek people